The Advertising Hall of Fame, operated by the American Advertising Federation (AAF), began in 1948 as a result of a proposal by the New York Ad Club and its president, Andrew Haire, to the Advertising Federation of America, the predecessor organization to the American Advertising Federation. The council of judges and its executive committee are appointed each year by the president of the American Advertising Federation and chair of the Advertising Hall of Fame. These distinguished industry executives are chosen from the ranks of advertisers, agencies, media organizations and academic institutions in the United States. The council of judges considers the election of either living or deceased persons whose record of advertising and service must be accomplished in the United States or with an American company abroad. To be eligible, individuals must be retired from their primary careers.

The first African-American woman creative to be inducted into the hall of fame was Carol H. Williams in 2017. Williams had made her name with campaigns that including, "Strong enough for a man, but made for a woman" for Secret deoderant.

Inductees

A
Carl J. Ally

B
Bruce Barton
Ted Bates
Howard H. Bell
William Bernbach
Marcel Bleustein-Blanchet
Neil H. Borden
Bonin Bough
John S. Bowen
Charles H. Brower
James E. Burke
Leo Burnett

C
Earnest Elmo Calkins
Jay Chiat
Charles T. Coiner
Fairfax M. Cone
Gertrude Crain
Cyrus H. K. Curtis

D
Donald Walter Davis
Roquel Billy Davis
Samuel Candler Dobbs
Philip H. Dougherty
Phil Dusenberry

E
Clarence Eldridge
Karl Eller
Roger Enrico

F
Bernice Fitz-Gibbon
Paul Foley
Jo Foxworth
Benjamin Franklin

G
Peter Georgescu
O. Milton Gossett
Katharine Graham

H
Joyce C. Hall
Claude Clarence Hopkins
Herbert Sherman Houston

J
Robert L. Johnson
John H. Johnson

K
Leo-Arthur Kelmenson
John E. Kennedy
Donald R. Keough
Ray A. Kroc
Alex Kroll
Michael Kassan

L
Roy Larsen
Albert D. Lasker
E. St. Elmo Lewis
George Lois
Henry R. Luce

M
Stanley Marcus
Patricia Martin
Harrison King McCann
Neil Hosler McElroy
James H. McGraw
Edwin T. Meredith
Thomas S. Murphy

N
Al Neuharth
Edward N. Ney
Arthur C. Nielsen Sr.

O
David Ogilvy
Alex F. Osborn

P
William S. Paley
Charles Coolidge Parlin
Charles D. Peebler Jr.
Shirley Polykoff
Alan Pottasch
John Emory Powers
Frank Presbrey
Erma Perham Proetz

R
Rosser Reeves
Helen Lansdowne Resor
Stanley Resor
Jean Wade Rindlaub
Hal Riney
Allen Rosenshine
George Presbury Rowell
Raymond Rubicam

S
David Sarnoff
John Smale
Frank Stanton
Arthur Ochs Sulzberger

T
Dave Thomas
Ted Turner

W
John Wanamaker
Artemas Ward
Mary Wells Lawrence
Carol H. Williams
Janet L. Wolff
Robert W. Woodruff
Lester Wunderman

Y
James Webb Young

References

External links
Advertising Hall of Fame

Advertising awards
Advertising
Organizations established in 1948
Hall of Fame
Businesspeople halls of fame